The following is a list of films produced in the Kannada film industry in India in 1960, presented in alphabetical order.

See also
Kannada films of 1961

References

External links
 Kannada Movies of 1960s at the Internet Movie Database
 http://www.bharatmovies.com/kannada/info/moviepages.htm
 http://www.kannadastore.com/

1960
Lists of 1960 films by country or language
Films, Kannada